The Men's 50 kilometre classical cross-country skiing competition at the 2002 Winter Olympics in Salt Lake City, United States, was held on 23 February at Soldier Hollow.

All skiers started at 30 second intervals, skiing the entire 50 kilometre course. The defending Olympic champion was the Norwegian Bjørn Dæhlie, who won in Nagano, but he retired after an accident, two years before the Olympics.

Results

References

Men's cross-country skiing at the 2002 Winter Olympics
Men's 50 kilometre cross-country skiing at the Winter Olympics